Gold 104.3 (call sign: 3KKZ) is a radio station broadcasting in Melbourne, Australia. Gold 104.3 is part of the Pure Gold Network (which itself is a part of the Australian Radio Network) and broadcasts on the 104.3 MHz frequency.

History

3KZ 
3KZ commenced operations on 8 December 1930. The radio station was initiated by the Industrial Printing and Publicity Group as a means of spreading its message, and in the station's early years, it was broadcast from the Victorian Trades Hall.

Its original frequency was 1350 kHz, moving to 1180 kHz on 1 September 1935. The frequency changed again on 23 November 1978 to 1179 kHz when all Australian AM radio stations were assigned new frequencies as part of the new 9 kHz spacing plan implemented.

3KZ was, along with 3DB, one of the "old guard" of Melbourne radio. (Don't Touch That Dial by Wayne Mac) In 1989, 3KZ was one of two successful bidders to convert to the FM band. 3KZ bid A$32 million for the right to convert to the FM band, the highest bid made for FM conversion in Australia. The second highest bid – A$20.1 million – was from radio 3AK (then operated by Bond Media), and the 3rd highest – A$10 million – was from 3TT.

KZFM 
As a result, 3KZ moved to 104.3 MHz at 12:00 am on 1 January 1990. The station relaunched as KZFM, despite the station's official call sign of 3KKZ, carrying over its successful "Hits And Memories" positioner, with some changes to presentation style. KZFM was simulcasted on both 1179 kHz and 104.3 MHz frequencies for one month before the old AM frequency was closed down, to be later reassigned (after 12 months) to 3RPH.

The KZ switch to FM paid immediate short term dividends, as the new KZFM debuted at number one in the first ratings survey of 1990, breaking an almost three-year dominance by rival Fox FM. However KZFM's success was short-lived, with ratings soon taking a dive and the station going into receivership in 1993. Radio network Austereo soon purchased the station to supplement its popular Fox FM, however after lack of direction from its new parent company, and severe staff reductions, removal of its news room, and other cost cutting measured at KZFM, ownership of which shortly changed to the Australian Radio Network, which was already operating rival radio station 101.1 TT-FM.

Gold 104.3 

On 7 October 1991, the KZFM branding was replaced with a new name of Gold 104 with a revamped playlist predominantly of hit songs from the 1960s and 1970s, under the banner "Good Times, Great Oldies". After the change in ownership with the Australian Radio Network, Gold became stable enough to re-build its market position, and return much of its heritage style from its days as 3KZ to the on-air presentation of the station. The original Gold 104 presenters were Shawn Cosgrove, Liz Sullivan, Gavin Wood, Craig Huggins, Bruce Neels, and Phil Baildon.

Gold 104.3 and sister station KIIS 101.1 broadcast from shared facilities, in the Pelaco Building in the Melbourne suburb of Richmond. Since the mid 2000s, the station has gradually shifted to a more contemporary format that now predominantly focuses on hits from the 1980s, 1990s and 2000s.

The current presenters include Christian O'Connell, Craig Huggins, Toni Tenaglia and Dave ‘Higgo’ Higgins.

Breakfast shows since 1999
 Apr 1999 – Dec 2011 – Grubby & Dee Dee for Breakfast
 Jan 2012 – Dec 2015 – Brig & Lehmo for Breakfast
 Jan 2016 – Dec 2017 – Jo & Lehmo for Breakfast
 Jun 2018–present – The Christian O'Connell Show

See also
 Radio Times

References

External links
Gold 104.3

Australian Radio Network
Classic hits radio stations in Australia
Radio stations established in 1930
Radio stations established in 1990
Radio stations in Melbourne